C. J. Sage  is an American poet and artist best known for her precise wordplay, internal rhymes, and lyrical poetry. Sage was also the editor of the National Poetry Review and Press until 2015.

Biography
C. J. Sage was born and raised in California.

After taking her M.F.A. in Creative Writing/Poetry at San Jose State University, she taught poetry, writing, and literature  at De Anza and Hartnell College. 

She is author of four collections of poetry, most recently, Open House (Salmon Poetry, 2017). Her third collection was The San Simeon Zebras (Salmon Poetry, 2010). Her second collection, Odyssea (Word Press, 2007), is a gender role-reversal of the Odyssey tale retold in modern times. Her first collection is, Let's Not Sleep (Dream Horse Press, 2001).  Sage has also edited one animal rights poetry anthology, And We the Creatures (Dream Horse Press, 2003), and one literature textbook Field Notes in Contemporary Literature (Dream Horse Press, 2005). Her poems have appeared in The Antioch Review, Barrow Street, Black Warrior Review, Boston Review, Copper Nickel, Orion, Ploughshares, POOL, Prairie Schooner, Shenandoah, The Southeast Review, The Threepenny Review, and others. She has also judged many poetry book contests, including those for her first publisher.

Sage resides in Rio del Mar, California, a coastal town on the Monterey Bay.

References

External links 
 Book: The San Simeon Zebras by Sage, C.J. (Salmon Poetry, 2010) 
 Book: Odyssea by Sage, C.J. (Turning Point, 2007) 
 Book: Field Notes in Contemporary Literature edited by Sage, C.J. (Dream Horse Press, 2005) 
 Book: And We the Creatures edited by Sage, C.J. (Dream Horse Press, 2003) 
 Book: Let's Not Sleep edited by Sage, C.J. (Dream Horse Press, 2001) 
 Audio: Writer's Sanctuary with Kim McMillon
 Audio: Belinda Subraman Presents
 Audio: Terrain.org edited by Buntin, Simmons B.
 Magazine: The National Poetry Review 
 Literary Press: The National Poetry Review Press

Living people
Artists from California
American women poets
21st-century American poets
21st-century American women writers
Year of birth missing (living people)
People from Santa Cruz County, California